Psychologies is a monthly women's magazine dedicated to personal development and well-being, published by Rossel.

History
Psychologies was founded in 1970 by Jacques Mousseau. Sales rose to 70,000 copies. 

In 1997, the magazine was bought by Jean-Louis Servan-Schreiber and his wife Perla Finev, who, taking inspiration from the American Psychology Today magazine, renamed and relaunched the Psychologies magazine. After only a few years of publication the magazine found success, and reached 320,000 copies in 2005. 

In 2004 Hachette Filipacchi Médias purchased 49% of Finev's capital. 

The following year saw the creation of five international editions of the Psychologies magazine in Italy, Spain, Belgium, the United Kingdom and Russia. In 2006 and 2007 Chinese and Romanian editions were created. In 2008 Lagardère Active bought out of the remaining 51% of Finev capital and a Mexican edition was created.

Its German version was launched by Madame Verlag in November 2013.

In 2014, Hachette sold Psychologies and Premiere to a group led by Rossel.

References

External links
psychologies.com   —   French
psychologies.co.uk   —    English
psychologies.it    —      Italian
psychologies.com.cn   —   Chinese
psychologies.ru    —      Russian
psychologiesrevista.com   —  Spanish
psychologies.ro  —  Romanian

1970 establishments in France
French-language magazines
Lagardère Active
Magazines established in 1970
Monthly magazines published in France
Popular psychology magazines
Women's magazines published in Italy
Women's magazines published in France
Women's magazines published in Spain